Letpandan  is a village in Bhamo Township in Bhamo District in the Kachin State of north-eastern Burma. Former Indian Communist leader Prakash Karat was born here.

References

External links
Satellite map at Maplandia.com

Populated places in Kachin State
Bhamo Township